Freddie Braun (born May 13, 1988 in Royal Oak, Michigan) is an American soccer player who currently plays for FC Mulhouse Portland in the National Premier Soccer League.

Career

College and amateur
Braun grew up in Rochester Hills, Michigan, attended Rochester High School, and played club soccer for the Michigan Wolves before going on to play four years of college soccer at the University of Louisville. As a senior in 2009 he captained the Cardinals to a 13–3–4 record and a third consecutive NCAA tournament appearance. Braun was the team's second-leading scorer in 2009, recording eight goals and four assists in his senior campaign, and finished his collegiate career with 11 goals and five assists in 81 games.

During his college years Braun also played for Chicago Fire Premier in the USL Premier Development League.

Upon the completion of his senior college season, he was one of 62 collegiate players invited to participate in the 2010 MLS Player Combine, but was not drafted; having been unable to secure a professional contract elsewhere, Braun instead decided to return to the PDL, and signed for the Portland Timbers U23s as an overage player. He helped Portland to a perfect 16–0–0 season and the PDL National Championship in 2010, and was selected to the PDL All-League team.

Professional
After training with the team throughout pre-season, Braun signed with the Portland Timbers of Major League Soccer on February 17, 2011. He made his professional debut on May 3, 2011 in a 1–0 loss to the San Jose Earthquakes in the Lamar Hunt U.S. Open Cup.

Braun was released by Portland on November 19, 2012.

Braun signed with USL Pro club Orlando City on March 8, 2013.

References

External links
 
 Louisville profile

1988 births
Living people
American soccer players
Louisville Cardinals men's soccer players
Chicago Fire U-23 players
Portland Timbers U23s players
Portland Timbers players
Orlando City SC (2010–2014) players
San Antonio Scorpions players
Sportspeople from Royal Oak, Michigan
Soccer players from Michigan
USL League Two players
Major League Soccer players
USL Championship players
North American Soccer League players
Association football midfielders